Robert Tela is a Papua New Guinean rugby league footballer who represented Papua New Guinea at the 1995 World Cup.

Playing career
Tela played for the Enga Mioks and represented Papua New Guinea in four tests between 1995 and 1996.

In 2011 he coached the Enga Tambuaks in the Highlands Zone Rugby Football League challenge.

References

Living people
Papua New Guinean rugby league players
Papua New Guinean sportsmen
Papua New Guinea national rugby league team players
Enga Mioks players
Papua New Guinean rugby league coaches
Rugby league five-eighths
Rugby league centres
Year of birth missing (living people)